UnCivil Liberties is a 2006 film directed by Thomas Mercer and starring Glenn Allen and Tony Grocki.

Plot
Set in the near future, UnCivil Liberties imagines a Big Brother–type government that uses technology to spy on its citizens. A militia assassin, Mike Wilson (Glenn Allen), is hired to kill a government agent, Cynthia Porter (Penny Perkins), who is reluctantly helping develop the technology. Wilson, however, cannot bring himself to assassinate Porter, and soon his partner, Sam Norton (Tony Grocki), is hired to kill Wilson.

After Wilson is dead and the militia headquarters are bombed, Norton decides to adopt Wilson's pacifism, and invites Porter to join him to change the future.

External links 
 
 

American thriller films
2000s thriller films
2006 films
2000s English-language films
2000s American films